Foot Stompin' Celtic Music (often abbreviated to "Footstompin'") is a record label based in Edinburgh, Scotland.

Artists
Martyn Bennett
Blazin' Fiddles
Julie Fowlis
Jim Malcolm
Anna Massie
Old Blind Dogs
Peatbog Faeries
Red Hot Chilli Pipers
Session A9
Simon Thoumire
Maeve MacKinnon
Broadway Play Stomp

References

"Artists", www.footstompin.com (2007). Retrieved 27 November 2007.

British record labels